Georgi Petrov (born 19 July 1980) is a Bulgarian badminton player. Petrov is a 5-time national champion. He has won several tournaments in Cyprus, Greece & Israel. In 2003 and 2007 he took part in the Badminton World Championships.

Achievements

IBF/BWF International 
Men's singles

Men's doubles

Mixed doubles

 BWF International Challenge tournament
 BWF International Series tournament
 BWF Future Series tournament

References 

1980 births
Living people
Bulgarian male badminton players
21st-century Bulgarian people